Kenneth S. Ramos is an American physician-scientist.

Early life and education
Ramos received his undergraduate degree from the University of Puerto Rico, his medical degree from the University of Louisville Health Sciences Center, and his Ph.D. from the University of Texas at Austin.

Career
Following his PhD, Ramos joined the University of Louisville Health Sciences Center where he served as a distinguished scholar and professor in the Department of Biochemistry and Molecular Biology. In 2014, he joined the University of Arizona as their Associate Vice President for Precision Health Sciences at the Arizona Health Sciences Center. The following year, he was elected a member of the National Academy of Medicine for his research in genomics and predictive biology, environmental and molecular medicine, and toxicology. He remained at the University of Arizona until 2019 when he accepted an appointment as executive director of the Institute of Biosciences and Technology in Houston and assistant vice chancellor for Health Services at the Texas A&M University System.

Personal life
Ramos and his wife Irma have two children together.

References

Living people
University of Puerto Rico alumni
University of Louisville alumni
University of Texas at Austin alumni
University of Arizona faculty
Texas A&M University faculty
Year of birth missing (living people)
Presidents of the Society of Toxicology
Members of the National Academy of Medicine